Samuel James Hungerford, CMG (16 July 1872 – 7 October 1955) was a Canadian railway executive. He was president of Canadian National Railway from 1934 to 1941, having been head of the system since 1932.

From 1937 to 1941, Hungerford was the first president of Trans-Canada Airlines. During the Second World War, he was president of the crown corporation National Railway Munitions. He was appointed CMG for his wartime services.

References 

1872 births
1955 deaths
20th-century Canadian businesspeople
Businesspeople from Quebec
Canadian Companions of the Order of St Michael and St George
Canadian National Railway executives